Khunda is a village in Jand Tehsil of  Attock District in Punjab Province of Pakistan. It is located at 70 km in north of Islamabad, the country's capital.

Notable persons
Malik Allahyar Khan (1927-2008), politician

References

External links 
Khunda Weather Forecast

Villages in Attock District